Daniltsevo is a rural locality (a village) in Muromtsevskoye Rural Settlement, Sudogodsky District, Vladimir Oblast, Russia. The population was 10 as of 2010.

Geography 
Daniltsevo is located on the Poboyka River, 14 km south of Sudogda (the district's administrative centre) by road. Volnaya Artemovka is the nearest rural locality.

References 

Rural localities in Sudogodsky District